Giorgi Gogshelidze (born 7 November 1979 in Gori) is a Georgian wrestler, who has won a silver medal at the 2008 Summer Olympics and a bronze medal at the 2012 Summer Olympics.

References 

 bio on fila-wrestling.com

External links
 

Male sport wrestlers from Georgia (country)
Olympic wrestlers of Georgia (country)
Wrestlers at the 2008 Summer Olympics
Wrestlers at the 2012 Summer Olympics
Olympic bronze medalists for Georgia (country)
Living people
1979 births
Olympic medalists in wrestling
Medalists at the 2012 Summer Olympics
Medalists at the 2008 Summer Olympics
World Wrestling Championships medalists
Olympic silver medalists for Georgia (country)
European Wrestling Championships medalists
World Wrestling Champions